Flay may refer to:

 Flaying, the removal of skin from the body

People
 Flay Brandström (born 1986), Swedish singer
 Bobby Flay (born 1964), celebrity chef and restaurateur

Arts, entertainment, and media
 Flay Allster, a fictional character in the anime Mobile Suit Gundam SEED
 Mr. Flay, a fictional character in the Gormenghast novels